Durga Bahadur Rawat is a Nepalese politician serving as a member of the Federal Parliament of Nepal elected from Kalikot-1, Province No. 6. He is the member of the Nepal Communist Party.

References

Living people
Nepal MPs 2017–2022
Nepal Communist Party (NCP) politicians
Nepal Workers Peasants Party politicians
Communist Party of Nepal (Maoist Centre) politicians
1969 births
Members of the Provincial Assembly of Karnali Province